Genocidal rape, a form of wartime sexual violence, is the action of a group which has carried out acts of mass rape and gang rapes, against its enemy during wartime as part of a genocidal campaign. During the Armenian Genocide, the second Sino-Japanese war, the Holocaust, the Bangladesh Liberation War, the Bosnian War, the Rwandan genocide, the Congolese conflicts, the Iraqi Civil War, the South Sudanese Civil War, the Rohingya genocide, the mass rapes that had been an integral part of those conflicts brought the concept of genocidal rape to international prominence. Although war rape has been a recurrent feature in conflicts throughout human history, it has usually been looked upon as a by-product of conflict and not an integral part of military policy.

Genocide debate 
Some scholars argue that the Convention on the Prevention and Punishment of the Crime of Genocide should state that mass rape is a genocidal crime. Other scholars argue that genocidal rape is already included in the definition under article two of the convention. Catharine MacKinnon argues that the victims of genocidal rape are used as a substitute for the entire ethnic group, that rape is used as a tool, with the target being the destruction of the entire ethnic group.

Siobhan Fisher has argued that forced impregnation and not the rape itself constitutes genocide. She says, "Repeated rape alone is still 'just' rape, but rape with the intent to impregnate is something more." Lisa Sharlach argues that this definition is too narrow because these mass rapes should not be defined as genocide based solely on those raped having been forcibly impregnated.

Rape as genocide 
 Per the United Nations Security Council Resolution 1820 (declared on 2008) rape and other forms of sexual violence can constitute war crimes, crimes against humanity or a constitutive act with respect to genocide.
According to Amnesty International, the use of rape during times of war is not a by-product of conflicts but rather a pre-planned and deliberate military strategy. In the last quarter of a century, the majority of conflicts have shifted from wars between nation states to communal and intrastate civil wars. During these conflicts the use of rape as a weapon against the civilian population by state and non-state actors has become more frequent. Journalists and human rights organizations have documented campaigns of genocidal rape during conflicts in former Yugoslavia, Sierra Leone, Rwanda, Liberia, Sudan, Uganda, and during the civil war in the Democratic Republic of the Congo. 

The strategic aims of these mass rapes are twofold. The first is to instill terror in the civilian population, with the intent to forcibly dislocate them from their land. The second is to degrade the chance of possible return and reconstitution by having inflicted humiliation and shame on the targeted population and to decrease social cohesion of a targeted group. These effects are strategically important for non-state actors, as it is necessary for them to remove the targeted population from the land. Rape as genocide is well suited for campaigns which involve ethnic cleansing and genocide, as the objective is to destroy, or forcefully remove the target population, and ensure they do not return.

One objective of genocidal rape is forced pregnancy, so that the aggressing actor not only invades the targeted population's land, but their bloodlines and families as well. However, those unable to bear children are also subject to sexual assault. Victims' ages can range from children to women in their eighties.

Documented instances 

Rape was widespread during the Armenian Genocide which was committed by the Ottoman Turks. During the death marches of Armenian civilians through Anatolia in 1915, Turkish soldiers frequently raped and killed Armenian women and children. In many cases, Turkish civilians also participated in these crimes.

In the Democratic Republic of the Congo (DRC) it is estimated that in 2011 alone there were 400,000 rapes. In the DRC, genocidal rape is focused on the destruction of family and communities. An interview with a survivor gave an account of gang rape, forced cannibalism of a fetus taken from an eviscerated woman, and child murder.

During the 1971 Bangladesh Liberation War, members of the Pakistani military and supporting Bihari and Razaker militias raped between 200,000  and 400,000 Bangladeshi women in a systematic campaign of genocidal rape. Some women may have been raped as many as eighty times in a night.

In the ongoing War in Darfur the Janjaweed militias have carried out actions described as genocidal rape, with not just women, but children also being raped, as well as babies being bludgeoned to death and the sexual mutilation of victims being commonplace.
 
During the Second Sino-Japanese War the Imperial Japanese Army during the Battle of Nanking carried out what has come to be known as the Rape of Nanking, which has been described by political scientist, Adam Jones, as "one of the most savage instances of genocidal rape". The violence saw tens of thousands of women gang raped and killed. The International Military Tribunal for the Far East estimated that 20,000 women were raped, including infants and the elderly.

A large portion of these rapes were systematized in a process where soldiers would search door-to-door for young girls, with many women taken captive and gang raped. The women were often killed immediately after being raped, often through explicit mutilation or by stabbing a bayonet, long stick of bamboo, or other objects into the vagina. Young children were not exempt from these atrocities, and were cut open to allow Japanese soldiers to rape them.

On 19 December 1937, the Reverend James M. McCallum wrote in his diary:
I know not where to end. Never I have heard or read such brutality. Rape! Rape! Rape! We estimate at least 1,000 cases a night, and many by day. In case of resistance or anything that seems like disapproval, there is a bayonet stab or a bullet ... People are hysterical ... Women are being carried off every morning, afternoon and evening. The whole Japanese army seems to be free to go and come as it pleases, and to do whatever it pleases.During the Rwandan genocide the violence took a gender specific form, with women and girls being targeted in a systematic campaign of sexual assault. It is estimated that between 250,000 and 500,000 were victims of rape. Those who survived the genocidal rape found themselves stigmatised, and many also discovered that they were infected with HIV. This has resulted in these women being denied their rights to property and inheritance as well as their employment chances being restricted. The first woman charged and convicted for genocidal rape was Pauline Nyiramasuhuko.

In 1996 Beverly Allen wrote Rape Warfare: The Hidden Genocide in Bosnia-Herzegovina and Croatia in which the term genocidal rape was first introduced, she used the term to describe the actions of the Serbian armed forces who had a policy of rape with the intention of genocide. In her book she compares genocidal rape to biological warfare. During the conflict in Bosnia Allen gave a definition of genocidal rape as "a military policy of rape for the purpose of genocide currently practiced in Bosnia-Herzegovina and Croatia by the Yugoslav army the Bosnian Serb forces and the irregular Serb forces known as Chetniks".

Coverage of the mass rapes during the ethnic cleansing carried out by the Serbian forces in the 1990s began the analysis over the use of rape as a part of genocide. Catharine MacKinnon argues that the mass rapes during the conflict "were a simultaneous expression of misogyny and genocide", and argues that rape can be used as a form of extermination.

The acts of violence which were committed against women during the Partition of India have also been cited as examples of genocidal rape.

Dyan Mazurana et al argued that the "patterns of rape and sexual violence carried out [in the Tigray War] by the ENDF, the EDF and Amhara regional militia and special forces against Tigrayan civilians are consistent with acts of genocide, potentially conducted with the intent of destroying the Tigrayan people."

See also
 Outline of Genocide studies

Footnotes

References

Bibliography

 

 
  

 

 

 

 

 

 
Crimes against women
Wartime sexual violence